Rabindra Nath Mahato is an Indian politician, currently serving as the Speaker of the Jharkhand Legislative Assembly. He is a leader belonging to Jharkhand Mukti Morcha. He was born in the year of 1960 in his paternal place Patanpur Jamtara in the Indian State of Jharkhand. His father is a retired primary school teacher. Currently he is residing at Barawa, Jamtara, Jharkhand.

Education 
Rabindra Nath Mahato is a Professional Graduate . He is a Graduate from Bhagalpur University Bhagalpur. He also completed B.ed. from Utkal University Odisha.

Political career 
Started his political career from Barawa, Jamtara Jharkhand as an independent candidate. He contested against 9 times MLA Dr. Vishweshwar Khan and lost in that election.

He joined Shibu Soren during Jharkhand Movement and soon due to his leadership quality and simple personality he became favorable leader of Jharkhand Mukti Morcha.

Later he won his first election of Jharkhand Legislative Assembly from Nala in the year 2005 but lost the subsequent election in 2009 before winning it again in 2014 and 2019 polls. In the Assembly election of 2019 the JMM along with INC and RJD formed the Government. Mr. Mahato was elected as 7th speaker of Jharkhand Vidhan Sabha.
As the speaker of this newly formed state he took important measures to improve the legislative work.
The assembly of this state was witnessing frequent disruptions in past, Mr. Mahato took the opposition leaders on board and utilized the time of debate and discourse to the fullest. Recently under his directions Jharkhand Vidhan Sabha celebrated its 20th foundation day.

See also
 Jharkhand Mukti Morcha
 Hemant Soren
 Jharkhand Legislative Assembly

References

1960 births
Living people
Speakers of the Jharkhand Legislative Assembly
Jharkhand Mukti Morcha politicians
Jharkhand MLAs 2014–2019
Tilka Manjhi Bhagalpur University alumni